The Department of Physics at Durham University in Durham, England, is a physics and astronomy department involved in both undergraduate and postgraduate teaching and scientific research.

Durham has the largest group working on particle theory in the United Kingdom. It is rated very highly for its work in Astronomy and Astrophysics, possessing the largest research group on galaxy evolution in Europe.

Located on the Mountjoy site south of the River Wear, the department is also home to two research institutes: the Institute for Particle Physics Phenomenology and the Institute for Computational Cosmology.

Research
There are a variety of research institutes, centres, and facilities: Institute for Computational Cosmology (ICC), the Institute for Particle Physics Phenomenology, the Centre for Advanced Instrumentation (CfAI), the Centre for Materials Physics, the Centre for Particle Theory, the Centre for Extragalactic Astronomy (CEA), Durham X-Ray Centre (XRDuR), Joint Quantum Centre (JQC), and the GJ Russell Microscopy Facility.

The department divides its research activities into five research groups:

 Advanced Instrumentation
 Astronomy and Astrophysics
 Atomic and Molecular Physics
 Condensed Matter Physics
 Elementary Particle Theory

Of the three astronomy research branches in the Durham Astronomy Research Cluster (CEA, the ICC, and the CfAI), the CEA focuses on observational research, the ICC on theoretical research, and the CfAI on astronomical instrumentation.

Founded in 2012, the Joint Quantum Centre (JQC) is a partnership between Durham and nearby Newcastle University broadly dedicated to various aspects of quantum science and technology. Among its components is the Durham Quantum Light and Matter (QLM) research section, which studies the quantum properties of atoms, molecules and solids and their interactions with light, as well as the technological applications of these studies. In 2020, the founding director of the JQC, Charles Adams, was awarded the Holweck Prize for work on light and atoms that 'could provide the ideal building blocks' for quantum computing.

Assessment
The 2014 Research Excellence Framework considered 96% of research carried out within the department to be either 'internationally excellent quality' or 'world leading', while the remaining 4% was listed as 'internationally recognised' by the framework – a method for assessing quality of research at British universities.

Undergraduate study
Each year the department admits approximately 170 undergraduates for courses in Physics, Physics and Astronomy, and Theoretical Physics. Course structures are designed to offer flexibility, with both three-year BSc and four-year MPhys degrees available. The BSc is suggested for prospective undergraduates interested in physics as preparation for another career, while the MPhys is recommended for those looking for a research-related career.

Admissions
Entry requirements are high. As of 2019, a typical A-level offer demands grades of A*A*A, to includes Physics and Mathematics, and a typical offer for the IB Diploma is 38, to include 776 in higher level subjects.

Graduate study
Taught postgraduate programmes include the MSc in Particles, Strings, and Cosmology and MSc in Scientific Computing and Data Analysis. The department also offers a MSc by Research in Physics (MScR) as preparation for further postgraduate study towards a PhD in physics.

Admissions
Applicants to these courses are required to have a good first or 2:1 UK honours degree (or the international equivalent) in Physics, Mathematics, or a related subject, with those interested in the MSc in Scientific Computing and Data Analysis also expected to possess 'profound programming knowledge' in both Python and C.

For entry to the PhD applicants are required to have achieved a first class honours degree, or at least a 2:1 integrated master's degree or a master's degree in an appropriate subject.

Astronomy

Astronomy within the department dates back to 1975. The scope of activity has grown substantially since then and it is now one of the largest astronomy groups in Europe. The Ogden Centre for Fundamental Physics building, designed by Studio Daniel Libeskind, opened in November 2016.

Reputation
In recent years the department has been singled out for the quality of its astronomical research. In 2008, Durham placed first in Europe and fourth in the world for research into astronomy and astrophysics over the decade 1998 to 2008, according to the Times Higher Education.

The Clarivate Analytics Highly Cited Researchers 2018 list placed Durham researchers first in the UK and second in Europe. David Alexander and Carlos Frenk were highlighted for their research, as were Adrian Jenkins and Tom Theuns.

In 2020 Frenk was made one of the Clarivate Citation Laureates in Physics (whose honourees are recognised for research judged to be 'of Nobel class') for his highly cited work on the evolution of the universe.

Centre for Extragalactic Astronomy
In order to mark the 40th anniversary of Durham astronomy, the Centre for Extragalactic Astronomy (CEA) was founded in 2015. Prior to this it was known as the Extragalactic Astronomy and Cosmology Group.

The research conducted at the CEA covers a broad variety of extragalactic astrophysics, including galaxy formation and evolution, observational surveys, active galactic nuclei (AGN), cluster of galaxies and the intergalactic medium.

The CEA consists of 20 faculty members, 12 postdoctoral researchers and 25 postgraduate researchers (correct as of December 2018). The founding director of the CEA was Ian Smail. The current director, as of December 2018, is Professor David Alexander.

Ogden Professor of Fundamental Physics

The Ogden Professor of Fundamental Physics is a professorship or chair in the Department of Physics at Durham University. The chair is named after Sir Peter Ogden. The chair was established in 2001, following a benefaction from Sir Peter.

List of Ogden Professors

 Professor Carlos Frenk 2001–present

Staff

The head of department is Nigel Glover, a specialist in particle physics, who succeeded Simon Morris in 2017.

As of 2021, the department reports a staff of 37 professors, 12 readers, 11 senior lecturers, 18 lecturers, 'about 100 post-doctoral researchers and fellows', and 150 PhD students.

Emeritus staff include, among others, Martyn Chamberlain, R. Keith Ellis, F. Richard Stephenson, and Brian Keith Tanner.

Alumni

References

Astronomy institutes and departments
Durham University
University departments in England
Physics departments in the United Kingdom

ar:مدرسة صحة جامعة دورهام